Robert Harms may refer to:
 Robert W. Harms (born 1946), American historian
 Robert T. Harms (1932–2016), American linguist